Swan River is located in the Canadian provinces of Manitoba and Saskatchewan.  The river, and several other features in the area, are named after the trumpeter swans found in the region.

Description 
The river is located in the Swan Lake drainage basin. Here it turns northeast, collecting tributary streams off the north escarpment of the Duck Mountains, and terminates at Swan Lake. Slopes on the south escarpment of the Porcupine Hills average .

Major tributaries include Maloneck Creek and Spruce Creek, (which originate in the Swan River plain), and Bear Head Creek, Roaring River, the West and East Favel Rivers, and the Sinclair River, (which originate in the Duck Mountains).

Communities located on the river include Swan River and Lenswood. Communities located on its tributaries include Norquay (on Spruce Creek), and Minitonas (on the East Favel River).

Surface water quality is generally good to fair. In recent years, total nitrogen and total phosphorus concentration data have shown a decreasing trend.

See also 
Assiniboine River fur trade#Upper Assiniboine and Swan River fur trade
List of rivers of Manitoba
List of rivers of Saskatchewan

References 

Rivers of Manitoba
Rivers of Saskatchewan
Bodies of water of Parkland Region, Manitoba